Kaya is a rural locality (a selo) and the administrative centre of Kayalinsky Selsoviet, Kulinsky District, Republic of Dagestan, Russia. The population was 577 as of 2010. There are 11 streets.

Geography 
Kaya is located 1 km northwest of Vachi (the district's administrative centre) by road. Vachi and Khoymi are the nearest rural localities.

Nationalities 
Laks live there.

Famous residents 
 Tsakhay Makayev (Hero of the Soviet Union)
 Gabibulakh Ganaliyev (Honored builder of Dagestan, laureate of the USSR State Prize

References 

Rural localities in Kulinsky District